William Leslie Mallory Sr. (October 4, 1931 – December 10, 2013) was an American politician who was elected to the Ohio House of Representatives in 1966 and served for 28 years in the Ohio legislature. In 1974 he won election as Majority Floor Leader, the first African American to serve in that role.

When he retired in 1994, he was the longest serving majority leader in the history of Ohio.

Mallory married his wife Fannie in 1955. They had six children, who like their father have pursued careers in politics and public service. Mark Mallory is the former mayor of Cincinnati. Dale Mallory is a former member of the Ohio House of Representatives. William Mallory Jr. serves as a judge in Hamilton County Municipal Court. Dwane Mallory serves as a judge in Hamilton County Municipal Court. Joe Mallory is the President of the Cincinnati NAACP and is a former Vice Mayor of Forest Park.

Mallory graduated from vocational school and then received his bachelor's degree in education from Central State University, He worked in juvenile court and taught elementary education. Mallory died at a hospice in Cincinnati on December 10, 2013.

References

External links
 Guide to 20th Century African American Resources, Cincinnati History Library and Archives.
 "William L. Mallory Sr., patriarch of Mallory family, dies at 82". Cincinnati.com
 "Capturing the Voices: An Oral Histories Project - An Interview with William L. Mallory Sr" CETconnect.org

1931 births
2013 deaths
Politicians from Cincinnati
Central State University alumni
Democratic Party members of the Ohio House of Representatives
African-American state legislators in Ohio
20th-century African-American people
21st-century African-American people